The siege of Colchester occurred in the summer of 1648 when the English Civil War reignited in several areas of Britain. Colchester found itself in the thick of the unrest when a Royalist army on its way through East Anglia to raise support for the King, was attacked by Lord-General Thomas Fairfax at the head of a Parliamentary force. The Parliamentarians' initial attack forced the Royalist army to retreat behind the town's walls, but they were unable to bring about victory, so they settled down to a siege. Despite the horrors of the siege, the Royalists resisted for eleven weeks and only surrendered following the defeat of the Royalist army in the North of England at the Battle of Preston (1648).

Background
On 21 May, the county of Kent rose in revolt against Parliament. Lord-General Fairfax led Parliamentary forces to Maidstone and on 1 June recaptured the town. Remnants of the Royalist forces commanded by the Earl of Norwich fled the county to rejoin the revolt in Essex.

On 5 June the Essex County Parliamentary committee in Chelmsford was taken prisoner by a riotous crowd. Colonel Henry Farre and some of the Essex Trained Bands declared themselves in support of the King. Charles Lucas took command of the Essex regiment and on 9 June he was joined by the Earl of Norwich, Lord Capel, Lord Loughborough, George Lisle and about 500 of the Royalist soldiers from Kent. The next day Lucas marched with what was now a total force of around 4,000 troops to Braintree where the county magazine was located. Meanwhile, however, Thomas Honywood, a member of the Essex county committee, had secured the weapons with the northern Essex Trained Bands, who had remained loyal to Parliament. Lucas continued to Colchester, arriving on 12 June, where he intended to raise more troops before continuing to Suffolk and then Norfolk, hopefully to raise those counties in support of the King.

Fairfax and his Parliamentary forces from Kent and the Essex forces under Thomas Honywood were joined outside Colchester by Colonel John Barkstead's Infantry Brigade from London on 13 June. In total, Fairfax now had more than 5,000 experienced troops and over one thousand cavalry. He decided to re-use the same tactics as he had recently employed against the Royalists in Maidstone by launching an immediate and full-scale assault.

The battle

The Royalists defended their position by placing troops on the outskirts of the town on Maldon Road, from where the Parliamentary army was approaching. The battle was fiercely fought as Barkstead's infantry attacked and were repulsed three times, the Royalists being well protected behind the hedges that lined the road. Finally the Parliamentary cavalry, significantly outnumbering the Royalist's horses, overwhelmed the Royalist flanks and the infantry were forced to retreat to behind the town's walls. Barkstead's pursuing men followed in through the gates, until a well planned counter-attack by Royalist infantry and cavalry routed them. Fairfax continued to attack and it was not until midnight that he finally called a halt and had to resign himself to the failure to take the town by storm. In the battle he had lost between 500 and 1,000 men while recorded Royalist losses were 30 men and two officers.  This is almost certainly a gross underestimate of Royalist losses.

The siege

As the siege started, both forces were about equal in men and both had an expectation of receiving reinforcements. Norwich was negotiating with the Suffolk men and knew that the Scots and  Langdale's Northern Royalist army were fighting for the Royalist cause, and that Earl of Holland, the commander of the Royalist forces in the South of England, was attempting to muster a relief force. Fairfax could expect detachments of the New Model Army to be sent to him as and when they became available.

The first priority for Fairfax was to secure the town from outside relief as well as excursions by the trapped men. He ordered the construction of forts to surround the town and sited his siege cannon to fire against the walls. His thinly spread men were soon reinforced when six companies of horse and dragoons arrived and when the Suffolk Trained Bands, who Norwich had expected to join the Royalists, instead joined the Parliamentary side. The Suffolk men were actually more concerned about preventing either side from spreading destruction into their county and in recognition of this Fairfax gave them the task of guarding the bridges across the River Colne to the north and east. Parliamentarian ships were ordered to blockade the harbour and the river mouth to prevent any re-supply via that route.

Inside the town, the local people found themselves trapped with an army with which most had very little sympathy. Colchester had been a staunch supporter of Parliament during the First English Civil War and any sympathy with the Royalist army soon vanished as the soldiers seized provisions from the town's people.
 
By 2 July the encirclement of the town was completed, severely limiting opportunities for the besieged soldiers to sally out for provisions. On 5 July, Lucas with 400 Cavalry and Lisle with 600 infantry attacked the Suffolk Trained Band guarding the East Gate. The Suffolk men were taken by surprise and were routed; in their enthusiasm, however, the Royalists found themselves too far from the town and were counter-attacked and suffered severe casualties, as well as losing the artillery and provisions they had taken with them.

On the night of 14 July, Fairfax ordered an attack on the Royalist fortification that lay outside the town walls. St John's Abbey and the house of Charles Lucas were captured despite fierce defence. The Royalist fortifications at St Mary's church were completely destroyed by artillery fire and with them the Royalists' main artillery battery.

Following the success of the battle to clear the town's suburbs, on 16 July Fairfax sent a trumpeter with a message offering surrender terms to the Royalists inside the town. Lucas's response was to threaten Fairfax that, if the trumpeter were to appear again with such a message, he would be hanged.

By this time Lord Norwich had heard of the failure of Earl of Holland to come to his relief. A detachment of the New Model Army under Colonel Adrian Scroope at St Neots had defeated the Earl of Holland in a night attack. On 15 July the Royalist cavalry, 1,000 strong, attempted a break-out of Colchester but were intercepted near Boxted. A tangle of engagements which lasted for a couple of days, known as the Battle of Boxted Heath, ended with the Royalists retreating back into Colchester on the 18th. An attempt by two cavalry troops to break out on the night of 18 July also failed. However, on 22 July, Bernard Gascoigne and his remaining cavalry escaped from Colchester via the Maldon road, fighting a fierce engagement with Parliamentary forces, and headed into Cambridgeshire, where they dispersed.

Even though the Royalists still had 3,000 soldiers, Fairfax's position was too strong, and with almost daily reinforcements his forces totalled at least 6,000. Still Lord Norwich could hope that his position would eventually be relieved. He received a letter from Langdale, the Northern Royalist army commander, encouraging the Essex men and promising relief within two weeks. For Lord Norwich, it seemed there still was every reason for them to keep their resolve.

By August, provisions in Colchester had all but run out. Cats, dogs and horses became the staple food. Fairfax refused to allow the townspeople to leave or even to let supplies in to them, despite repeated petitions from outside the town, pleas from Colchester Town council, and even from Lord Norwich. Fairfax's decision was despite the loyalty of the town to Parliament during the First Civil War. Eventually matters became so desperate that the citizens of Colchester were forced to eat soap and candles. When the townswomen and children attempted to beg for food at the town gates, they were turned away with nothing by the besieging soldiers. In a last appeal to the humanity of the besiegers, the Royalist commanders sent 500 starving women to the Parliamentarian lines, hoping that they might acquire food by inspiring sympathy. Colonel Rainsborough undermined this plan by ordering the women stripped naked, to the great amusement of his army.

On 24 August news reached Fairfax of Cromwell’s victory at the Battle of Preston. In celebration, the Parliamentary artillery fired salutes and Fairfax had kites flown into the town carrying news of the destruction of the Royalist army. That same day, talks were started to end the siege. Fairfax would not listen to any terms from Lord Norwich, but offered his own which were not open for negotiation. They were that common soldiers and junior officers were granted quarter; however, senior officers must surrender to mercy, whereby no guarantee was given as to how they might be treated.

On the morning of 28 August, the Royalist army laid down their arms. The gates were opened and the victorious Parliamentary regiments entered the town with Lord-General Fairfax at their head. The terms of surrender were that:
 The Lords and Gentlemen were all prisoners of mercy.
 The common soldiers were disarmed and issued with passes to return to their homes after they had sworn an oath not to take up arms against Parliament again. The town was to be preserved from pillage upon paying £14,000 in cash.

References in popular culture
The siege is commonly believed to have inspired the nursery rhyme Humpty Dumpty,  which is said to have been the nickname of a large Royalist cannon strategically placed on the wall next to St Mary's Church.  The Parliamentary bombardment of 14 July damaged the wall, causing "Humpty Dumpty" to be destroyed.  Other stories attribute the name Humpty Dumpty not to a cannon but to a Royalist sniper, "One-Eyed Thompson", who occupied the belfry of St Mary's Church and was shot down by Parliament forces. The nursery rhyme is first attested in 1797, but apparently the first time the rhyme was linked to the siege was in 1996 on the East Anglia Tourist Board's website.

Fairfax is also spoken of in Milton's 15th sonnet.

Citations

References

Further reading

Further reading

Williamson, Hugh Ross (1942). Captain Thomas Schofield.

Colchester, siege of
Colchester, siege of
Colchester, siege of
Colchester, siege of
History of Colchester
17th century in Essex